Gruyère cream (French: Crème de Gruyère) is a double cream produced in the canton of Fribourg. It is named after the region of Gruyères, from which it originates. In Switzerland, double cream must contain at least 45 percent fat. Gruyère cream contains about 50 percent, which gives it its thickness and smoothness.

Gruyère cheese is notably produced in the same region since the 13th century. Cream production, however, is reputed since the 19th century only. Joseph Favre in particular, a cook from Valais, praised Gruyère cream as one of the finest in Europe, owing its great quality to that of the Alpine pastures. In the early 20th century, armaillis who went down to the village for mass, brought with them Gruyère cheese and Gruyère cream as an offering for the priest. Nowadays, in the canton of Fribourg, Gruyère cream is considered the quintessential cream and found in all dairies. When a person enters a dairy to ask for cream, he is spontaneously served double cream, without having to specify.

Gruyère cream is traditionally served in a wooden tub, with a carved wooden spoon. It is often served along with meringues for dessert. Gruyère cream is also served with fritters, bricelets, aniseed bread, croquets and cuquettes. Gruyère cream is listed in the Culinary Heritage of Switzerland.

See also
Swiss cheeses and dairy products
Swiss cuisine

References

Swiss cuisine
Culinary Heritage of Switzerland
Dairy products
Canton of Fribourg